The Helen Suzman Foundation is an independent, non-partisan think-tank in South Africa dedicated to promoting liberal democratic values and human rights in post-apartheid South Africa through its research, publications, litigation and submissions to the South African Parliament.

The foundation was established in honour of Helen Suzman, a long-time liberal opposition MP who opposed apartheid in the South African parliament and the foundation's patron. Its liberalism is grounded in Helen’s legacy, and draws from the history of liberal thought in South Africa.

The foundation believes that the Constitution of South Africa is a liberal document. In its preamble the Constitution calls for “a society based on democratic values, social justice and fundamental human rights”, which aims to “free the potential of each person” and where “every citizen is equally protected by law”.

The foundation publishes opinion pieces on its website, in a quarterly electronic magazine, Focus, and via email.

Academic R. W. Johnson was the foundation's first director until he resigned in 1995. Johnson's successor at the Foundation, Lawrence Schlemmer, In 2006, former Democratic Alliance MP Raenette Taljaard succeeded Schlemmer to become the foundation's director. She, in turn, was succeeded by the present Director, Francis Antonie, in 2010.

References

Think tanks based in South Africa
Foundations based in South Africa
Civic and political organisations based in Johannesburg